Tamaarashi Kōhei (born Kōhei Narita; August 1, 1941 – February 28, 1993) was a sumo wrestler from Memuro, Hokkaidō, Japan. He made his professional debut in September 1956, and reached the top division in July 1962. His highest rank was maegashira 4. He left the sumo world upon retirement in July 1967.

Career record
The Kyushu tournament was first held in 1957, and the Nagoya tournament in 1958.

See also
Glossary of sumo terms
List of past sumo wrestlers
List of sumo tournament second division champions

References

1941 births
Japanese sumo wrestlers
Sumo people from Hokkaido
1993 deaths